Eupithecia columbiata is a moth in the family Geometridae first described by Harrison Gray Dyar Jr. in 1904. It is found in North America from eastern Newfoundland and Labrador to Vancouver Island, south to North Carolina in the east and Colorado in the west. The habitat consists of deciduous and mixed-wood forests and forest edges, as well as shrubby areas.

The wingspan is 13–24 mm. Adults are dull yellow-brown with darker grey-brown markings. Adults are on wing in spring, from mid April to mid June in Alberta.

The larvae feed on Rhamnus purshiana, Betula papyrifera, Salix, Prunus, Alnus, Cornus, Philadelphus, Ceanothus, Populus, Amelanchier and Acer species. The species overwinters in the pupal stage.

References

Moths described in 1904
columbiata
Moths of North America